The Jeepster is an automobile originally produced by Willys-Overland Motors from 1948 to 1950. It was developed to fill a gap in the company's product line, crossing over from their "utilitarian" proto SUVs and trucks to the passenger automobile market. 

The Jeepster initially included numerous deluxe features and interior fittings in addition to a high level of standard equipment that cost extra on other automobiles. A total of almost 20,000 were manufactured.

The Jeepster name was revived in 1966 on a new model, the C-101 Jeepster Commando.

Background
After World War II, Jeep trademark owner, Willys (pronounced "WILL-is"), began producing and marketing the "CJ" (for Civilian Jeep) to farmers, foresters, and others with similar utilitarian needs. The company also began producing the Jeep Wagon/Panel Utility/Pick-up in 1946, and the Jeep Truck in 1947.

Seeing a gap in their product lineup, Willys developed the Jeepster to crossover from their "utilitarian" trucks to the passenger automobile market. It was to expand its Jeep work truck focus and thus broaden Willys' customer base. The new sporty rear-wheel-drive-only model was to have a "dual personality for city and country driving" and marketing emphasized it as "America's greatest value in sports cars!"

Willys-Overland lacked the machinery to form deep-drawn fenders or complicated shapes, so the vehicle had to use a simple and slab-sided design. Industrial designer Brooks Stevens styled a line of postwar vehicles for Willys using a common platform that included the Jeep pickup and station wagon, as well as a sporty two-door open car that he envisioned as a sports car for veterans of World War II.

The Willys-Overland Jeepster ("VJ" internally) was introduced in April 1948, and produced through 1950. Some leftover models were sold under the 1951 model year.

1948

The basic 1948 Jeepster included numerous deluxe features and interior fittings in addition to a high level of standard equipment that cost extra on other automobiles. These included, among many others, whitewall tires, hubcaps with bright trim rings, sun visors, deluxe steering wheel, wind wings, locking glovebox, cigar lighter, and continental tire with fabric cover. The Jeepster had Willys' World War II-proven  straight-4 "Go Devil" engine, and plastic side curtains, but its  price was about the same as a Ford Super DeLuxe Club convertible with roll-down windows, fancier styling, and a V8 engine.

The car was only offered with rear-wheel drive, thus limiting its appeal to typical Jeep customers. Its distinctive boxy styling and performance were praised by automotive journalists. However, the Jeepster did not catch on with the intended market segment. Sales were also limited by sparse advertising and an insufficient dealer network.

The Planadyne single transverse leaf spring independent front suspension, entire drivetrain, front end, rear suspension, steering, and four-wheel drum brakes were from the Willys Station Wagon. The flat-topped rear fenders were taken from the Jeep truck line.

1949
The 1949 Jeepster began production with a one-model/one-engine offering. The price was lowered to $1,495, with some previously standard features returning as extra-cost options. Toward the middle of the year, an additional model was introduced, the VJ3-6, powered by Willys' new L148 Lightning I-6 engine.

1950

The 1950 model year featured the VJ-3 Jeepster's first styling revisions that included a new instrument panel and redesigned front end featuring a V-shaped grille with horizontal chrome trim. A new model was introduced with reduced standard equipment at a lower price.

Willys' L161 Lightning six-cylinder was offered in addition to the standard Go Devil four-cylinder engine. 

Model designations were dependent on production timeframe, with early 1950s four-cylinder Jeepsters given VJ-3 463 and six-cylinders VJ-3 663, changed to VJ-473 and VJ-673, respectively, for later year vehicles.

Engines
 1948-1950 - L134 Go Devil I4 — 
 1949-1950 - L148 Lightning I6 —
 1950 - F134 Hurricane I4 —
 1950 - L161 Lightning I6 —

Epilogue
The Jeepster's problems in the marketplace were its limited utility and practicality. It also looks rugged and off-road capable, but is not. Appeal is limited due to the basic construction, poor all-weather protection, and the low performance when equipped with the I-4 engine. Even with an optional six-cylinder engine and offering the VJ3 version at a lower price, the Jeepsters did not draw many new buyers due to three factors: a relatively high price, low performance, and the lack of roll-up door windows.

Model year sales:

 1948 - 10,326
 1949 - 2,960
 1950 - 5,836

A total of 19,132 Jeepsters were produced.

The Jeepster name was revived by Kaiser for the 1967 model year as the C-101 Jeepster Commando. However, this version came with roll-up door windows, V6 engine, four-wheel-drive and available as a pickup truck, convertible, and station wagon, in addition to roadster. American Motors Corporation (AMC) purchased Kaiser's Jeep utility-vehicle operations in 1970 to complement its existing passenger-car business. The Jeepster was reengineered to use AMC engines and production continued for several years.

See also
Willys Jeep
Kaiser Motors

Notes

References

External links 

 
 Willys Overland Jeepster Club
 Hurst Jeepster Pages
 Jeepster History
 Midstates Jeepster Association
 Jeepster clubs

Jeepster
Jeepster
Convertibles
Cars introduced in 1948
Rear-wheel-drive vehicles
Motor vehicles manufactured in the United States